Robert Lynch Sánchez (born 18 November 1997) is a Spanish professional footballer who plays as a goalkeeper for Premier League club Brighton & Hove Albion and the Spain national team. Sánchez came through Albion's youth academy.

Club career

Early life and career
Sánchez was born in Cartagena, Region of Murcia. He was born to a Jamaican-English father and Spanish mother. He spent his early career playing locally with Escuela de Fútbol de Santa Ana, Cartagena FC and Ciudad Jardín before joining Levante in 2010.

Brighton & Hove Albion
Sánchez moved to England to sign for Brighton & Hove Albion at the age of 15, before signing his first professional contract in June 2015. He signed a new three-year contract with the club in April 2018.

Loan spells
In June 2018, Sánchez moved on loan to Forest Green Rovers for the 2018–19 season. He played in the opening game of the season making his debut away at Grimsby where Rovers won 4–1. Sánchez was recalled by parent club Brighton in January 2019 to provide cover as Albion's Mathew Ryan was called up for Australia for the Asian Cup. He made 17 appearances for Forest Green that season, all coming in the league.

On 24 July 2019, Sánchez joined Rochdale on loan for the 2019–20 season. He made his debut for the club in a 3–2 away win over Tranmere Rovers.

Return to Brighton
On 1 November 2020, Sánchez made his Brighton debut, playing in a 2–1 defeat in a Premier League match against Tottenham Hotspur. On 23 February 2021, Sánchez signed a new four-and-a-half-year contract with Brighton, running until June 2025.

Sánchez was sent off in the 1–1 home draw against Newcastle United on 6 November, in Brighton's eleventh match of the 2021–22 season, for fouling Callum Wilson who was within a goalscoring opportunity. He kept a clean sheet in the 4–0 win over Manchester United on 7 May 2022, helping Brighton earn their record top flight victory, with his long-range pass providing a crucial role in Pascal Groß's goal.

In the second half of the 2022–23 season Sánchez lost his number one spot to long standing back-up keeper Jason Steele, with Brighton manager Roberto De Zerbi saying that "he is sad for Robert" and that he has "one of the best relationships" with the player.

International career
Sánchez was born in Spain to an English father and Spanish mother. Sánchez received his first call-up to the Spanish national team in March 2021, for 2022 FIFA World Cup qualification matches against Greece, Georgia and Kosovo.

He was selected to the Spain squad for the delayed UEFA Euro 2020 tournament in May 2021. Sánchez and David de Gea remained as understudies to Unai Simón and did not make an appearance as Spain were knocked out on penalties against Italy in the semi-final at Wembley Stadium on 6 July.

He made his international debut on 5 September 2021, replacing Simón in the second half of a World Cup qualifier 4–0 win against Georgia in Badajoz.

Sánchez was part of Spain's 2021 UEFA Nations League Finals squad in October. He remained as back-up and did not make an appearance in either of the semi-final victory over Italy or the final loss against France as Spain finished as runners-up.

On 11 November 2022, Sánchez was named in Spain's 26-man squad for the 2022 FIFA World Cup.

Style of play
Sánchez has said that he modelled himself on Spanish goalkeepers Iker Casillas and David de Gea.

Career statistics

Club

International

Honours
Spain
UEFA Nations League runner-up: 2020–21

References

External links
Profile at the Brighton & Hove Albion F.C. website

1997 births
Living people
Sportspeople from Cartagena, Spain
Footballers from the Region of Murcia
Spanish footballers
Spain international footballers
Spanish people of English descent
Spanish people of Jamaican descent
Association football goalkeepers
Cartagena FC players
Levante UD footballers
Brighton & Hove Albion F.C. players
Forest Green Rovers F.C. players
Rochdale A.F.C. players
English Football League players
Premier League players
UEFA Euro 2020 players
2022 FIFA World Cup players
Spanish expatriate footballers
Expatriate footballers in England
Spanish expatriate sportspeople in England